The Lee conformal world in a tetrahedron is a polyhedral, conformal map projection that projects the globe onto a tetrahedron using Dixon elliptic functions. It is conformal everywhere except for the four singularities at the vertices of the polyhedron. Because of the nature of polyhedra, this map projection can be tessellated infinitely in the plane. It was developed by L. P. Lee in 1965.

Coordinates from a spherical datum can be transformed into Lee conformal projection coordinates with the following formulas, where  is the longitude and  the latitude:

 
where 

and sm and cm are Dixon elliptic functions.

Since there is no elementary expression for these functions, Lee suggests using the 28th degree MacLaurin series.

See also

 List of map projections
 AuthaGraph projection, another tetrahedral projection, 1999
 Dymaxion map, 1943
 Peirce quincuncial projection, 1879
 Polyhedral map projection, earliest known is by Leonardo da Vinci, 1514

References

Map projections
Conformal projections